Virginia Kull is an American actress who has appeared in Big Little Lies, NOS4A2, The Looming Tower, and others. In addition to her roles in film and television, she has appeared in various Broadway productions.

Early life and education  
 
Virginia Kull was born in Dallas, Texas. She originally wanted to be a doctor, but she decided to pursue an acting career while attending Bowie High School. She studied theater at the Meadows School of the Arts at Southern Methodist University, graduating in 2004.

Personal life 
Kull married Ryan Howard Young on May 2, 2009, at St. Paul's Lutheran Church in Brooklyn, New York.

Filmography

Film

Television

References 

21st-century American actresses
Living people
Place of birth missing (living people)
American film actresses
American television actresses
Year of birth missing (living people)